The Inventory of Historic Battlefields is a heritage register listing nationally significant battlefields in Scotland. The inventory was published for consultation in December 2010 by Historic Scotland, an agency of the Scottish Government, and launched as the Inventory in May 2011.  Seventeen sites were included in the first phase of the inventory, with a number of other sites under consideration for inclusion at a later date. By the end of 2012 the inventory had expanded to 39 sites. The list is maintained by Historic Environment Scotland, the successor the Historic Scotland.  there are 40 battlefields on the inventory, the most recent addition being the Battle of Sark which was listed in 2016.

The list of battlefields is intended to guide landowners, developers, local authorities and the Scottish Ministers in the future development of these areas to protect the historic significance and archaeological potential of these sites. The inventory entries summarise historic sources, archaeological evidence and finds, significance, and provide a map defining the extent of the battlefield.  Selection criteria used for identifying nationally important sites were: historical association; physical remains and archaeological potential; cultural association; and landscape context.

Battlefields on the Inventory

See also
 Registered Battlefields (UK)

References

External links

 Inventory of Historic Battlefields, Historic Scotland
  Looking after our heritage » Battlefields, Historic Scotland
 Battlefield Consultation, Historic Scotland

 
Battles involving Scotland
Historic Environment Scotland
Heritage registers in Scotland
Lists of monuments and memorials in the United Kingdom
Military history of Scotland
Scottish history-related lists